The Intruder, also known as I Hate Your Guts, Shame and The Stranger (UK title), is a 1962 American drama film directed and co-produced by Roger Corman and starring William Shatner. The story, adapted by Charles Beaumont from his own 1959 novel of the same name, depicts the machinations of a racist named Adam Cramer (portrayed by Shatner), who arrives in the fictitious small Southern town of Caxton in order to incite white townspeople to racial violence against black townspeople and court-ordered school integration.

Plot
In the early 1960s, Adam Cramer arrives in the small Southern town of Caxton with an agenda that soon becomes clear. Caxton's "whites only" high school is about to undergo forced desegregation and admit black students due to a court order, and the racist Cramer, purportedly working on behalf of an organization called The Patrick Henry Society, is working to incite the white townspeople to strongly and possibly violently resist the desegregation. Although Cramer is not from the area or even from the South (shown by his lack of a Southern accent), he quickly charms most of the people he meets, presenting himself as a confident, smooth-talking, well-mannered gentleman. He quickly convinces wealthy landowner Verne Shipman to back him, and seduces Ella, the pretty teenage daughter of the local newspaper editor Tom McDaniel.

The white locals are not happy about having black students attend the "white school", but prior to Cramer's arrival, most were prepared to grudgingly comply with the law. However, after Cramer, with Shipman's help, makes an inflammatory speech in front of the town hall and organizes a cross burning in the black neighborhood, the whites are moved to violence, first threatening a black family who happen to be driving through town after Cramer's speech, and then blowing up the local black church, killing the preacher. After the church bombing, Cramer is jailed, but the locals join together to get him quickly released.

Apart from his racist rabblerousing, Cramer also seduces Vi, the emotionally unstable wife of traveling salesman Sam Griffin, Cramer's next door neighbor at the Caxton hotel. Vi, ashamed of her lapse, leaves Griffin, who figures out what happened and comes after Cramer with Cramer's own gun. The terrified Cramer's confident facade crumbles for the first time; when he manages to get the gun and point it back at Griffin, he is too weak to pull the trigger, and Griffin reveals that he already removed the bullets from the gun before the confrontation. Griffin predicts that Cramer will soon lose control of the racially charged tensions that he has ignited in the town.

McDaniel, after seeing Cramer in action, realizes that his own sympathies are with the blacks and feels compelled to stand with them against the racists. After the preacher is killed, the families of the black students hesitate to send their children back to the white high school for fear of more violence, but McDaniel encourages them, and walks the students to school himself through the town past the disapproving glares of other white townspeople. After the students enter the school, several townspeople confront and severely beat McDaniel, causing him to be hospitalized with broken ribs, internal injuries and the loss of his eye. Cramer secretly meets with Ella, who is upset and worried about her father, and convinces her that the townspeople are planning to kill her father and that the only way to save him is for Ella to do what Cramer says.

Ella, following Cramer's directions, lures her black classmate Joey Green to a storage room on the pretext of helping her get some heavy boxes from a high shelf. She then screams and falsely accuses him of attempting to rape her. Joey denies it, and the principal believes him, but also knows that most people will believe Ella. An angry mob led by Cramer and Shipman forms in front of the school. Joey, rather than escape out the back door with the principal and attempt to reach the safety of the sheriff's office, insists on going out to confront the mob. Shipman beats Joey and the mob begins to lynch him on the school playground swing set. Suddenly Griffin appears with Ella, who confesses that she lied at Cramer's instigation in order to save her father's life. In front of the mob, Ella apologizes to Joey, telling him that Cramer said he would not be harmed and would only be expelled from the white school. Realizing that they have been manipulated by Cramer, the townspeople slowly walk away, ignoring Cramer's exhortations, until only he and Griffin are left on the empty playground. Griffin tells Cramer that his "work" in Caxton is finished and that he should catch the next bus out of town.

Cast
William Shatner as Adam Cramer
Frank Maxwell as Tom McDaniel
Beverly Lunsford as Ella McDaniel
Robert Emhardt as Verne Shipman
Leo Gordon as Sam Griffin
Charles Barnes as Joey Greene
Charles Beaumont as Mr. Paton
Katherine Smith as Ruth McDaniel
George Clayton Johnson as Phil West
William F. Nolan as Bart Carey
Jeanne Cooper as Vi Griffin
Phoebe Rowe as Mrs. Lambert

The film's cast features a number of writers. Charles Beaumont, George Clayton Johnson and William F. Nolan were all working screenwriters and novelists; all three of them make their only acting appearance in a feature film in The Intruder. Leo Gordon was also an established screenwriter, writing several novels and films, and over 50 teleplays for various shows, while maintaining a concurrent acting career. Star William Shatner would, years later, also write numerous novels and memoirs.

Production

Development
The novel was published in 1958 and film rights were optioned by Seven Arts. They were unable to get the project off the ground, and Corman bought the rights in 1960. He tried to get the film made with producer Edward Small for United Artists but Small pulled out. He then envisioned the film costing $500,000 and starring Tony Randall. However, he was unable to raise enough money, with the movie being turned down by UA, Allied Artists and AIP. Corman managed to raise some funds from Pathé Labs, with Corman and his brother Gene putting in the balance. Gene Corman later said:
We put our hearts, our souls – and what few people do – our money into this picture. Everybody asked us 'Why would you make this picture?' as if to say why try to do something you believe in when everything else is so profitable. Obviously we did it because we wanted to, and we think it's a damn good job.

Shooting
It was shot in black and white over three and a half weeks on location in southeast Missouri. Some of the production took place in East Prairie, Charleston and Sikeston. Corman presented a watered-down version of the script to the townspeople, but they still did not like it. Before it was finished, local people objected to the film's portrayal of racism and segregation.

In an interview in 2006, Roger Corman explained how he filmed William Shatner's racist speech with a crowd of town's people present: "When we did this scene we needed a crowd, so we announced on the local radio station that we were going to shoot a meeting at the town hall. And I knew from experience that people come out to see a picture shoot, because they’re interested, but then they find out how long it takes to set up the camera between shots and so forth and then they start drifting away. So my first shots were the big reaction shots, because I knew we would have a smaller crowd later on. Bill was doing the speech, but not every single line. It wasn’t until three or four in the morning that we reversed the camera on Bill and he did his whole speech. By that time his voice had become a little bit hoarse, but I thought it actually added something to his performance."

Reception

The movie received some good reviews but encountered difficulty obtaining release. Pathé released it in New York, but eventually pulled out and the Corman brothers took over distributing the movie themselves. It had a budget of only $90,000.

The New York Times''' Bosley Crowther published a somewhat negative review of The Intruder in May, 1962, describing it as "an angry little film", that "...spews so much anti-Negro venom and so many ugly epithets that it makes one squirm with distaste and uneasiness..." Crowther criticized the movie as being "...crudely fashioned from obvious clichés and stereotypes..." However, Crowther included a few favorable comments about the film as well, adding: "... it does break fertile ground in the area of integration that has not yet been opened on the screen. And it does so with obvious good intentions and a great deal of raw, arresting power in many of its individual details and in the aspects of several characters."

Corman sold the film to Mike Ripps who ran Cinema Distributors of America which had recently reissued the film Bayou under the title Poor White Trash''.

In an interview Roger Corman explained why he thinks the movie failed to find an audience:"I think it failed for two reasons. One: the audience at that time, the early sixties, simply didn’t want to see a picture about racial integration. Two: it was more of a lecture. From that moment on I thought my films should be entertainment on the surface and I should deliver any theme or idea or concept beneath the surface."

See also
 Civil rights movement in popular culture

References

External links 
 
 
 
 
 
Sam Hamm on The Intruder at Trailers From Hell
 Original soundtrack of The Intruder

1962 films
1962 drama films
American black-and-white films
American drama films
Films about racism
Films about race and ethnicity
Films based on American novels
Films directed by Roger Corman
Films produced by Gene Corman
Films produced by Roger Corman
Films scored by Herman Stein
Films set in the United States
Films shot in Missouri
Films with screenplays by Charles Beaumont
1960s English-language films
1960s American films